The 1st Cavalry Division Horse Cavalry Detachment is a United States Army equestrian military unit. Posted at Fort Hood, Texas, it was activated in 1972 and is a subordinate unit of the 1st Cavalry Division.

History
In 1943, at the height of World War II, the 1st Cavalry Division disposed of its remaining horses. The Horse Cavalry Detachment was activated 29 years later, in 1972. It is one of seven horse-mounted units remaining in the U.S. Army.

In 2014 the first woman to lead the detachment, Captain Elizabeth R. Rascon, assumed command.

Mission
The mission of the Horse Cavalry Detachment is to support the 1st Cavalry Division and Fort Hood by participating in ceremonies and other events; to support the U.S. Army in its public relations and recruiting efforts; and to preserve and maintain the standards of drill and traditions of the U.S. Cavalry during the 1800's.

The detachment has primarily public duties functions. It participates in change of command and medal ceremonies, the U.S. presidential inauguration, and represents the 1st Cavalry Division in parades, riding demonstrations, and civic events. In addition to official state and military ceremonies, it has participated in the Rose Parade, Professional Rodeo Cowboys Association rodeos, and U.S. Army recruiting events. Finally, a weekly mounted drill demonstrating equestrian vaulting and cavalry tactics, such as sabre charges, is held for the public by the detachment every Thursday morning at Fort Hood.

The Horse Cavalry Detachment's mounted drills are drawn from the U.S. Army's 1883 Manual of Cavalry Tactics.

Equipment

Armaments and vehicles
The 40-soldier unit is equipped with 33 dark brown horses with minimal white markings which are outfitted with Model 1885 McClellan riding saddles that are hand-made by cavalry troopers in an on-site leather shop maintained at the unit's stables. Each of the unit's mounts are trained for approximately one year before being put into action. It additionally deploys 4 mules, a mascot dog (Sergeant Buddy), a Model 1878 supply wagon, and a M1841 Light Mountain Howitzer. Individual soldiers are equipped with the 1873 Springfield Carbine Trap Door (Breech Lock) Model Caliber 45-70, 1873 Colt Single Action Caliber .45 Revolver, and the 1860 Light Cavalry Saber.

Uniforms
The Horse Cavalry Detachment is designated by the U.S. Army as a "special ceremonial unit" which allows it to wear specialized, unit-specific uniforms not part of standard Army issue.

See also
 Musical Ride (a Royal Canadian Mounted Police equestrian drill)
 United States Cavalry

References

Ceremonial units of the United States military
Military units and formations established in 1972
1972 establishments in Texas